Bernardo Rodríguez y Alfaro (born August 20, 1781)  was a Costa Rican politician and signer of the Act of Independence of Costa Rica.

Personal life and background
Born in Heredia, Costa Rica, on August 20, 1781, he married on June 17, 1804 in Barva.

Career
In October, 1821 he was appointed representative of the City Council of Barva on the Board of Legacy of the councils, which met at Cartago from October, 25–26, 1821 to discuss the independence of Costa Rica from Spain. Then on October, 29, 1821 he signed the Act of Independence of Costa Rica.

From April 16–30, 1823 he represented the town of Barva in the Constituent Congress chaired by José María de Peralta y La Vega.

1781 births
Year of death missing
People from Heredia (canton)
Costa Rican people of Spanish descent
Members of the Legislative Assembly of Costa Rica